Potbelly Corporation is a publicly traded American fast-casual restaurant chain that focuses on submarine sandwiches and milkshakes. Potbelly was founded in 1977 in Chicago, and its name refers to the potbelly stove. Potbelly's menu features a variety of sandwiches that are all served hot, and the menu  includes soup, shakes, smoothies, potato chips and cookies. Some locations have presented live music from local musicians during the lunch hours.

History 

In 1971, Peter Hastings started an antique store, Hindsight, at 2264 North Lincoln Avenue in the Lincoln Park neighborhood of Chicago. The store had an old potbelly stove, which Hastings began using to make toasted sandwiches to serve to shoppers. In 1977, the Hindsight store was retooled into a restaurant, Potbelly Sandwich Works.

In 1996, Bryant Keil purchased the original store and expanded the company, The second store was opened in 1997, and he expanded Potbelly to over 300 stores in several states and the District of Columbia. Investors include Maveron (Founded by Starbucks Founder, Howard Schultz) and American Securities. As of August 2019, approximately 10% of the chain's 450+ locations were franchisees.

In August 2013, Potbelly filed an initial public offering with US regulators to raise up to $75 million. Shares in the company began trading on the NASDAQ Stock Market on October 4, 2013. The market cap shortly after the IPO was approximately $650,000,000.

On November 5, 2007, a new Potbelly store in Glen Ellyn, Illinois, became the first to feature a drive-through. A second drive-through store was added shortly thereafter in Waukegan, Illinois.

In 2011, Potbelly opened two franchise stores in Dubai in the United Arab Emirates; these are the first international Potbelly locations.

Potbelly opened its first European store at Westfield Stratford City, London, in July 2015 and its first Canadian store in Toronto in October 2016. By August 2017, 60% of Potbelly's business came from lunch. It had 424 owned stores and 54 franchised stores. Early that month, Potbelly announced it was considering putting itself for sale.

In December 2017, Potbelly opened its first franchise in India with a new location in Cyber City, Gurgaon. The company signed a multi-franchise agreement with India's Kwals Group, with plans to open five franchises in the country by the end of 2018 and 20 locations over the next five years.

Potbelly carries just Zapp's potato chips and has an exclusive Zapp's brand of dill pickle chips that have the flavor of a Potbelly pickle.

In July 2020, Potbelly named Robert Wright, a former executive of Wendy's, its new President and CEO.

In April 2022, Potbelly entered its first delivery-based franchise partnership with REEF, the largest operator of virtual restaurants, logistics and proximity hubs in North America.

Controversies 
During the COVID-19 crisis, Potbelly Sandwich Shop applied for and accepted $10 million under the PPP (Paycheck Protection Program) which the United States government created for small businesses to maintain workers through the COVID-19 crisis.  On April 14, 2020, the company was awarded $10 million in PPP Loans from the federal government. Protesters began picketing April 20, 2020, at the Chicago headquarters demanding the return of the funds. Potbelly Sandwich Shop announced on April 25, 2020, that they would return the $10 million loan.

See also 

 List of submarine sandwich restaurants

References

External links 
 Official website

Companies based in Chicago
Restaurants in Chicago
Regional restaurant chains in the United States
Fast-food chains of the United States
Submarine sandwich restaurants
Fast casual restaurants
Restaurants established in 1977
1977 establishments in Illinois
Restaurant chains in the United States
American companies established in 1977
2013 initial public offerings
Companies listed on the Nasdaq